Askellia pygmaea, the dwarf alpine hawksbeard, is a species of Asian and North American plants in the tribe Cichorieae within the family Asteraceae.

Distribution
It is native to western, northern, and eastern Canada (Yukon, Northwest Territories, British Columbia, Alberta, Nunavut, Quebec, Labrador, Newfoundland), the western United States (Alaska, Montana, Wyoming, Colorado, Idaho, Utah, Nevada, Washington, Oregon, California), Russia, Mongolia, Kazakhstan, and western China (Tibet + Xinjiang).

Description
Askellia pygmaea is a perennial up to 20 cm (8 inches) tall, with a deep taproot and spreading by means of underground rhizomes thus forming dense clumps. Stems are sometimes erect, but sometimes trailing along the ground. One plant can have more than 80 small flower heads, each with 9-12 yellow ray florets but no disc florets.

References 

Cichorieae
Flora of North America
Flora of Asia
Plants described in 1812